Pelham (also known as Sugar Tit) is an unincorporated community in Spartanburg County in the upstate of the U.S. state of South Carolina.  The Sugar Tit area has about five mile radius around Joe's Lake.  It is located around the junction of State 101 and State 296 southeast of Greer, between Reidville and Five Forks.  It is mostly farmland and plantations.  After BMW came more subdivisions and industrial parks appeared in the area.

The Sugar Tit name is from a time when the men spent so long socializing at the local general store, their wives complained they took to the store like a baby to a sugar tit.

References

External links
 Sugar Tit, South Carolina: Town with Hilarious Name
 How Sugar Tit got its name

Unincorporated communities in South Carolina
Unincorporated communities in Spartanburg County, South Carolina
Geography of Spartanburg County, South Carolina
Upstate South Carolina